The 2016 PBA All-Star Weekend was the annual all-star weekend of the Philippine Basketball Association (PBA)'s 2015–16 season which was held on August 4–7, 2016 at the Smart Araneta Coliseum, Quezon City. This was the fourth All-Star Weekend that was held at the Coliseum, the first since 2009.

Schedule of events
The All-Star Weekend festivities started on August 4, 2016 with a visit of PBA players in the Heroes Ward of the V.Luna General Hospital, and a meet and greet session with the PBA players at the Ali Mall. The following day, there were the Obstacle Challenge, 3 point shootout, the slam dunk competition and the Blitz game between the Greats and Stalwarts, of which were held at the main venue.

On August 6, Saturday, a clinic for referees was conducted in a covered court of Brgy. Pinagkaisahan, Quezon City, followed by a basketball fair and another meet and greet session at the Food Court of the Coliseum. An exhibition game between selected PBA board members and executives including PBA Commissioner Chito Narvasa, 1-Pacman Representative and GlobalPort Batang Pier team owner Mikee Romero and Special Assistant to the President Christopher Go and the members of the PBA Press Corps was also held at the venue itself.

On the final day of the event, a shooting stars contest and a women's 5x5 basketball exhibition were held, before the exhibition game between the North All-Stars and the South All-Stars, the main event of the All-Star Weekend.

Friday events

Greats vs Stalwarts
This year's Blitz Game saw the return of Greats vs Stalwarts. The game included young PBA players, selected players from PBA D-League and PBA Legends.

Game

Obstacle Challenge

Gold represent the current champion.

First round
The winners of each pairing in the first round advanced to the final round.
Scottie Thompson def. Chris Banchero
Carlo Lastimosa def. Jeric Fortuna
Paolo Taha def. Chris Newsome
Mark Cruz def. Emman Monfort
Maverick Ahanmisi def. Brian Heruela
Mark Barroca def. Jai Reyes

Three-Point Contest

Gold represent current champion.

Slam Dunk Contest

Gold represent the current champion.

Saturday Events
An exhibition game between PBA Board and PBA Press Corps was held while having a basketball fair for the fans outside of the Smart Araneta Coliseum.

Game

Sunday events

Shooting Stars
The return of the Shooting Stars had a different format. There was one PBA player, one Women's 3x3 player, one Batang PBA player and a lucky fan from Cignal TV. Team B led by Jericho Cruz of Rain or Shine Elasto Painters won the Shooting Stars.

Women's 5 on 5 game
The Women's 5 on 5 game was composed of players from the league's Women's 3 on 3 tournament. The game was played in 12 minute halves.

Game

All-Star Game

Coaches
Yeng Guiao, coach of the Rain or Shine Elasto Painters, and Leo Austria, coach of the San Miguel Beermen, were selected as the North and the South head coach, respectively.

Roster
The rosters for the All-Star Game were chosen in two ways. The starters were chosen via a fan ballot (online and at the venue during PBA games). Players are assigned to represent the North or South All-Star teams based from their place of birth. Players born in Luzon are assigned to the North All-Stars team while players born in Visayas and Mindanao are assigned to represent the South All-Stars. If the player is born outside the Philippines, the player is assigned to his parents' birthplace. Two guards and three frontcourt players who received the highest vote were named the All-Star starters. The reserves are voted by the twelve PBA coaches after the results of the fan ballot are released.

INJ1 Calvin Abueva was unable to participate due to chronic tonsilitis and dehydration
INJ2 Greg Slaughter was unable to participate due to an injured ankle
 Gabe Norwood started in place of Calvin Abueva
 Asi Taulava started in place of Greg Slaughter

Game

See also
2015–16 PBA season
Philippine Basketball Association
Philippine Basketball Association All-Star Weekend

References

Philippine Basketball Association All-Star Weekend
All-star weekend